Qasr Bayir is a desert castle built in 743 CE by Prince Walid bin Yazid. It is found in the desert of Jordan and it was destroyed in 1931.

History
In 743, during the Umayyad period, the future caliph Al-Walid II had the castle built in what is today the Jordanian badiya (desert). The structure was 70 meters long and was built of large sandstone blocks. It was destroyed in 1931 by Beake Pasha and the stone blocks were used to construct an Arab Legion outpost.

References

Further reading

External Links 
 Photos of Bayir at the American Center of Research

Umayyad palaces
Umayyad architecture in Jordan
8th-century establishments in the Umayyad Caliphate
Tourist attractions in Jordan
Buildings and structures in Jordan